Montanha is a settlement in the central part of the island of Santiago, Cape Verde. It is situated 2 km north of João Teves and 8 km southwest of Pedra Badejo. The area is intensively farmed; mainly maize, beans and sugar-cane.

Mahogany trees

There are two African mahogany trees near the village of Banana (part of the settlement Montanha), standing at the bottom of the Ribeira Montanha valley, 400 m above sea level. The trees were identified as an Important Bird Area (IBA) by BirdLife International because they support a colony of purple herons or Bourne's herons.

References

Villages and settlements in Santiago, Cape Verde
São Lourenço dos Órgãos
Important Bird Areas of Cape Verde